Thea Lim is a Singaporean Canadian writer, whose debut novel An Ocean of Minutes was named as a shortlisted finalist for the 2018 Scotiabank Giller Prize.

Born in Canada and raised mostly in Singapore, Lim has an MFA in creative writing from the University of Houston. She published the novella The Same Woman in 2007, and An Ocean of Minutes followed in 2018. She taught in the University of Toronto's Writing and Rhetoric Program, before joining the faculty of Sheridan College's Creative Writing & Publishing program.

Bibliography
The Same Woman (2007)
An Ocean of Minutes (2018)

References

21st-century Canadian novelists
21st-century Canadian women writers
21st-century Singaporean women writers
Canadian women novelists
Singaporean novelists
Singaporean emigrants to Canada
University of Houston alumni
Writers from Toronto
Living people
Canadian writers of Asian descent
1981 births